Dr Coenraad Beyers (1893–1975) was a South African historian, archivist, and herald.

He joined the State Archives in 1927, and was Chief Archivist from 1944 until he retired in 1953.

In 1956, he served on the official committee appointed to investigate the practical aspects of setting up an heraldic authority.  In 1959, he was appointed the head of the Heraldry Section established by the Department of Education, Arts & Sciences to manage official arms and flags, and register the arms and badges of associations and institutions.

When this section was superseded by the Bureau of Heraldry in 1963, he served as the first State Herald.  He stepped down in 1964 to become the Bureau's senior professional officer, and  retired finally in 1971.

See also
 Bureau of Heraldry

References
 Dictionary of South African Biography

 
 

South African heraldists
1893 births
1975 deaths
Afrikaner people
Officers of arms
South African heraldry